The Distillers Company Limited was a leading Scottish drinks and pharmaceutical company and, at one time, a constituent of the FTSE 100 Index. It was taken over by Guinness & Co. (now part of Diageo) in 1986 in a transaction which was later found to be involved in fraudulent activity, becoming known as the Guinness share-trading fraud.

History
The company's origins lie in a trade association known as the Scotch Distillers' Association formed by Menzies, Barnard & Craig, John Bald & Co., John Haig & Co., MacNab Bros, Robert Mowbray and Macfarlane & Co. in 1865.

It was incorporated in 1877 and combined with John Walker & Son and Buchanan-Dewar in 1925.

It was acquired by Guinness in 1986 and was renamed as United Distillers in 1987. 

In 1998 United Distillers was merged with International Distillers & Vintners to create United Distillers & Vintners, forming the spirits division of Diageo plc. The company still exists today as Diageo Scotland Ltd.

Pharmaceuticals
From 1942, Distillers Biochemicals (DCBL) operated an Agency Factory of the British Ministry of Supply manufacturing penicillin in Speke. The plant was one of the first two factories in Europe to produce penicillin. Following World War II, DCBL purchased the facility for approximately four million dollars.

Distillers was also responsible for the manufacture of the drug Thalidomide in the United Kingdom. Thalidomide had been developed by Grunenthal with whom, in July 1957, DCBL signed a sixteen-year contract to market the drug. DCBL ordered 6,000 tablets for clinical trial and 500 grammes of pure substance for animal experiments and formulation. Thalidomide was marketed in the United Kingdom under the name Distaval, beginning on 14 April 1958. Advertisements emphasised the drug's complete safety, using phrases such as non-toxic and no known toxicity. Later, Thalidomide was marketed under the names Asmaval, Tensival, Valgis, and Valgraine and found to cause nerve damage and malformations in births.

The Speke site, also known as Speke Operations, was eventually sold to Eli Lilly and Company in 1963. In February 2022 it was acquired by TriRX.

Chemicals and plastics
Since 1915, during the World War I, Distillers supplied industrial alcohol for making explosives. In 1922, it started to manufacture Discol-branded motor fuel made from alcohol. In 1928, it formed together with Turner and Newall the Carbon Dioxide Co Ltd to for sale of gas, a byproduct of their operations. In 1930, Distillers formed the British Industrial Solvents for production of acids and other solvents from industrial alcohol. In 1933, it formed Gyproc Products which was sold to British Plaster Board in 1944. In 1937, Distillers acquired British Resin Products. In 1939, it acquired a controlling stake in Commercial Solvents and 50% interest in BX Plastics, which full control was acquired in 1961. It followed by getting 48% shareholding in F. A. Hughes and Co. in 1941 and taking the full control in 1947. In 1947, F. A. Hughes and Co. was merged into British Resin.

In 1947, British Petroleum Chemicals was incorporated as a joint venture of AIOC and Distillers Company.  In 1956, the company was renamed British Hydrocarbon Chemicals.

In 1945, Distillers formed a joint venture British Geon with B. F. Goodrich to produce polyvinyl chloride and in 1954 it started a partnership named Distrene with Dow Chemicals to produce polystyrene. In 1955, it took full control of Magnesium Elektron.
In 1967, BP acquired chemical and plastic assets of The Distillers Company which were merged with British Hydrocarbon Chemicals to form BP Chemicals.

Directors of note

Leonard Alsager Elgood FRSE 1943 to 1960.

See also
 Pharmaceutical industry in the United Kingdom

References

Bibliography

External links
History page on Diageo website
 
 Article about The Distillers Company at www.gracesguide.co.uk
 Article about The Distillers Company at www.scotchwhisky.com

British companies established in 1877
Scottish malt whisky
Companies formerly listed on the London Stock Exchange
Food and drink companies disestablished in 1986
Scandals in Scotland
1877 establishments in Scotland
Manufacturing companies based in Edinburgh
Pharmaceutical companies of Scotland
Pharmaceutical companies of the United Kingdom
Drink companies of Scotland
History of Edinburgh
Food and drink companies established in 1877
Chemical companies of Scotland
1986 mergers and acquisitions